The Interprovincial Amateur Hockey Union (IAHU or IPAHU) was the premier amateur ice hockey league in Canada after the split between the amateur and professional ice hockey teams of the Eastern Canada Amateur Hockey Association (ECAHA) in 1908.

History
In November 1908, the Montreal Victorias resigned from the ECAHA and proposed to set up a new amateur ice hockey league. The founding meeting of the new Interprovincial league was held on November 14, 1908. That same day, the Montreal Hockey Club resigned from the ECAHA after not being allowed to hold on to Didier Pitre, whom the club had signed from Montreal Shamrocks. Montreal HC then met with the Victorias to apply. The league's first president was Blair Russel of the Victorias. The first vice-president was Percy Quinn of Toronto AAC, second vice-president was A. Sutherland of Ottawa Cliffsides and the treasurer was A. A. Eaves of the Montreal Hockey Club. The same day the team representatives wrote the league's constitution.

The teams began play in January 1909 with a four-team league of  the Victorias, Montreal Hockey Club, Ottawa Cliffsides and Toronto AAC. Toronto AAC would continue play in the Ontario Hockey Association senior series as well.

In February 1909, it was announced that a new championship trophy for Canadian amateur teams was donated by Sir Montagu Allan. The new Allan Cup was given to the Victorias of the IAHU as the premier amateur team. Ottawa Cliffsides were IAHU champions and became Allan Cup champions as well. The Cliffsides would lose the Allan Cup in a challenge to Queen's College of Kingston, Ontario.

For 1910–11, the league doubled to eight teams, with two Ottawa teams and two Montreal teams in the Central division, and a new Eastern division with teams in Grand Mere, Trois Rivieres, Westmount and Sherbrooke. The league expanded again for 1911–12 to thirteen teams, with four in the Central, five in the Eastern and four in a new Montreal division. In 1912–13, the league expanded to fifteen teams in five divisions. It was the peak of membership in the Interprovincial, as in 1913–14 the Montreal teams left to join the Montreal City League, the Ontario teams to various senior leagues, leaving only a single East division of five teams. 1913–14 was the final season of the Interprovincial.

Teams

 Almonte, (1912–13)
 Brockville, (1911–1913)
 Carleton Place, (1912–13)
 Grand-Mère H/C, (1910–1914)
 Montreal Nationals, (1911–12)
 Montreal Victorias, (1908–1913)
 Montreal Hockey Club, (1908–1913)
 Montreal St. Patricks, (1911–12)
 Montreal Shamrocks, (1911–12)
 Ottawa College, (1912–13)
 Ottawa Cliffsides, (1908–1911)
 Ottawa New Edinburghs, (1910–1913)
 Ottawa Stewartons, (1911–1913)
 Perth Crescents, (1912–13)
 Pembroke, (1912–13)
 Quebec Laurentide, (1913–14)
 Quebec St. Patricks, (1912–1914)
 Renfrew, (1911–1913)
 Shawinigan Falls, (1912–14)
 Sherbrooke, (1910–1914)
 Smiths Falls, (1912–13)
 Toronto Amateur Athletic Club, (1908-1910)
 Trois Rivieres, (1910–1912)
 Montreal Westmount, (1910–1912)

Seasons

† Allan Cup champion

References

Bibliography

Notes

Defunct ice hockey leagues in Canada